Right Of Way/Eucalyptus station is a light rail stop on the Muni Metro M Ocean View line, located in the Merced Manor neighborhood of San Francisco, California. It opened in 1925 with the first phase of the line. The station is located where the line's private right-of-way crosses Eucalyptus Drive, with narrow side platforms located on the near side of the grade crossing. The southbound platform is across the tracks from the northbound platform of Right Of Way/Ocean station. The stop is not accessible to people with disabilities.

References

External links 

SFMTA – Right Of Way/Eucalyptus Dr inbound and outbound
SFBay Transit (unofficial) – Right Of Way/Eucalyptus Dr

Muni Metro stations
Railway stations in the United States opened in 1925